New Kingston is a hamlet in Delaware County, New York, United States. New Kingston has a post office with ZIP code 12459, which opened on September 7, 1840.

References

Hamlets in Delaware County, New York
Hamlets in New York (state)